Noriyuki Sekine ( Sekine Noriyuki; 13 January 1931 – 19 June 2022) was a Japanese politician.

A member of the Liberal Democratic Party, he served in the House of Councillors from 1991 to 1998.

Sekine died in Kawagoe, Saitama on 19 June 2022 at the age of 91.

References

1931 births
2022 deaths
Liberal Democratic Party (Japan) politicians
Members of the House of Councillors (Japan)
20th-century Japanese politicians
University of Tokyo alumni
Politicians from Saitama Prefecture
Recipients of the Order of the Rising Sun, 2nd class